Little Mosque on the Prairie is a Canadian television sitcom created by Zarqa Nawaz and produced by WestWind Pictures, that originally aired on CBC Television. Little Mosque on the Prairie follows the Muslim population of the fictional rural prairie town of Mercy, Saskatchewan. It premiered on January 9, 2007 and ended on April 2, 2012, with a total of 90 episodes over the course of 6 seasons.

Series overview

Episodes

Season 1 (2007)

Season 2 (2007–08)

Season 3 (2008–09)

Season 4 (2009–10)

Season 5 (2011)

Season 6 (2012)
On February 11, 2011, it was announced that CBC had renewed the series for a sixth and final season. The final season began airing on January 9, 2012 and consisted of 11 episodes.

Special (2010)

References

External links

Lists of sitcom episodes
Lists of Canadian television series episodes
Television episodes about Islam